Natural healing may refer to:

In biology:
Healing, the natural process of regeneration of damaged tissue

In pseudoscience:
Vitalism
Naturopathy (also known as Naturopathic medicine)